Why Can't We Be a Family Again? is a 2002 American short documentary film directed by Roger Weisberg and Murray Nossel about two African American brothers in Brooklyn struggling to reunite with their mother, a recovering drug addict. It was nominated for an Academy Award for Best Documentary Short.

See also
 List of documentary films

References

External links

Why Can't We Be a Family Again? at Filmakers Library

2002 films
2002 short documentary films
American short documentary films
American independent films
Documentary films about families
Documentary films about drug addiction
Films set in Brooklyn
Documentary films about African Americans
2002 independent films
2000s English-language films
2000s American films